Cristina Gómez Arquer (born 22 March 1968) is a Spanish handball player. She is the player with most caps (277) for the Spain women's national handball team. She scored 897 goals for the Spanish national team, more than any other player.

She competed at the 1992 Summer Olympics in Barcelona, where Spain placed 7th, and at the 2004 Summer Olympics in Athens, where the Spanish team reached the quarter finals and finished 6th.

References

External links 
 
 
 

1968 births
Living people
Sportspeople from Barcelona
Spanish female handball players
Olympic handball players of Spain
Handball players at the 1992 Summer Olympics
Handball players at the 2004 Summer Olympics